The Fool and His Money is a puzzle game by Cliff Johnson. It is a self-published sequel to the 1987 game The Fool's Errand. Like its predecessor, The Fool and His Money contains many different types of logic and word puzzles which, although centered on a story with a medieval tarot deck theme, have added elements of the Prince, Egyptian gods, and Pirates.

Release information
Originally expected in late 2003, the game experienced dozens of postponements. On February 4, 2009, Johnson released a functioning preview of the game, containing the Prologue and five puzzles.

The game was released on October 25, 2012, one day earlier than finally promised, having taken ten years to produce. It is written using Adobe Director with embedded Flash.

Reception and awards
“I'm happy to award, for the first time in my reviewing career, The Fool and His Money a long-overdue but well-deserved A plus. We, God forbid, may never see another game of its genius and quality in our lifetimes.” —Greg Collins, Just Adventure Review

JayIsGames rated it Best of 2012.

References

External links
 Official website

2012 video games
Cliff Johnson games
MacOS games
Puzzle video games
Video games developed in the United States
Windows games